In China, posthumous names 諡 were conferred upon Emperors, Empresses, and notable officials by the imperial court up until the fall of Qing dynasty in 1911. The following list is limited to officials. For posthumous names of Emperors, see List of Chinese monarchs. The name is most often used in the combination surname + posthumous name + "gong 公," as appears in all formal references.

During Ming and Qing dynasties, posthumous names of officials were formalized and fixed at two characters. The first character Wen 文 was typically only given to those who had obtained Jinshi degree and served in the Hanlin Academy. Among all posthumous names, Wenzheng 文正 was considered the most prestigious, followed by Wenzhong 文忠, etc.

Terms used in posthumous names
The "Rules for Posthumous Names" section of the Lost Book of Zhou features an elaborate explanation of the terms used in posthumous names. Entries are sorted according to alphabetical order based on Hanyu Pinyin romanization.

Wen 文

Wen 文
Han Yu 韓愈
Bai Juyi 白居易
Wang Anshi 王安石
Zhu Xi 朱熹
Wencheng 文成
Liu Ji 劉基
Wang Yangming 王阳明
Wending 文定
Liu Kezhuang 劉克莊
Shen Shixing 申時行
Xu Guangqi 徐光啟
Wenhe 文和
Zhang Tingyu 張廷玉
Wenmin 文敏
Zhao Mengfu 趙孟頫
Dong Qichang 董其昌
Wenxiang 文襄
Zuo Zongtang 左宗棠
Zhang Zhidong 張之洞
Wenzhen 文貞
Wei Zheng 魏徵
Xu Jie 徐階
Wenzheng 文正
Fan Zhongyan 范仲淹
Sima Guang 司馬光
Xu Heng 許衡
Wu Cheng 吳澄
Li Dongyang 李東陽
Xie Qian 謝遷
Zeng Guofan 曾國藩
Wenzhong 文忠
Ouyang Xiu 歐陽修
Su Shi 蘇軾
Zhang Juzheng 張居正
Lin Zexu 林則徐
Li Hongzhang 李鴻章

Wu 武

Wumu 武穆
Yue Fei 岳飛
Wuning 武寧
Xu Da 徐達
Wulie 武烈
Sun Jian 孫堅

Others

Zhongsu 忠肅
Yu Qian 于謙
Zhongwu 忠武
Zhuge Liang 諸葛亮
Han Shizhong 韓世忠
Chang Yuchun 常遇春
Yi Sun-sin 李舜臣
Zhongzheng 忠正
Shi Kefa 史可法

Cultural history of China